Peroxide fusion is used to prepare samples for inductively coupled plasma (ICP), atomic absorption (AA) analysis and wet chemistry.  Sodium peroxide (Na2O2) is used to oxidize the sample that becomes soluble in a diluted acid solution. This method allows complete dissolution of numerous refractory compounds like chromite, magnetite, ilmenite, rutile, and even silicon, carbides, alloys, noble metals and materials with high sulfide contents.

Peroxide fusion can be performed either manually or with automated systems. The latter have the advantage of increasing productivity, improving safety, maintaining repeatable preparation conditions, and avoiding spattering as well as cross-contamination.

Peroxide fusion vs. other dissolution methods

Acid digestion is the most common dissolution method used for many types of samples. Unfortunately, acid digestion involves numerous manipulations of concentrated acids. Some types of samples even require the use of perchloric acid (HClO4) that is explosive when it comes into contact with any organic materials. It can be readily combined with hydrofluoric acid (HF) and brought to a fumic state to drive off this volatile acid that is extremely dangerous to human health, not to mention it will dissolve the walls of any glass container it is being processed within. Moreover, it is often difficult to get full dissolution of the sample, even when using these hazardous chemicals.

References

 Enzweiler,J., Potts,P. and Jarvis,K. 1995. Determination of platinum, palladium, ruthenium and iridium in geological samples by isotope dilution inductively coupled plasma mass spectrometry using a sodium peroxide fusion and tellurium coprecipitation. Analyst, 120, p1391-1396
 Jin,X. and Zhu,H. 2000. Determination of platinum group elements and gold in geological samples with ICP-MS using a sodium peroxide fusion and tellurium co-precipitation. J. Anal. At. Spectrom., 15, p747-751
 Galindo, C., Mougina, L. and Nourreddinea,A. 2007. An improved radiochemical separation of uranium and thorium in environmental samples involving peroxide fusion. Applied Radiation and Isotopes. 65, p9-16
Quick and Easy Dissolution of Chromite Ores, Ferrochromes, and Chromium Slags for ICP-OES without using HF or HClO4. Spectrocopy Online, May 1, 2014. Volume 29, Issue 5.

Analytical chemistry